Erik Brynjolfsson (born 1962) is an American academic, author and inventor. He is the Jerry Yang and Akiko Yamazaki Professor and a Senior Fellow at Stanford University where he directs the Digital Economy Lab at the Stanford Institute for Human-Centered AI, with appointments at SIEPR, the Stanford Department of Economics and the Stanford Graduate School of Business. He is also a research associate at the National Bureau of Economic Research and a best-selling author of several books. He is known for his contributions to the world of IT productivity research and work on the economics of information and the digital economy more generally.

Biography 

Erik Brynjolfsson was born to Marguerite Reman Brynjolfsson and Ari Brynjolfsson, a nuclear physicist.
He earned his A.B., magna cum laude, in 1984 and his S.M. in applied mathematics and decision sciences at Harvard University in 1984. He received a Ph.D. in Managerial Economics in 1991 from the MIT Sloan School of Management.

Brynjolfsson  served on the faculty of MIT from 1986 to 2020, where he was a professor at the MIT Sloan School of Management and Director of the MIT Initiative on the Digital Economy, and Director of the MIT Center for Digital Business.  Previously, he was at Harvard from 1985 to 1995 and Stanford from 1996 to 1998. In 2001 he was appointed the Schussel Family Professor of Management at the MIT Sloan School of Management. He lectures and consults worldwide, and serves on corporate boards. He taught the popular course 15.567, The Economics of Information: Strategy, Structure, and Pricing, at MIT  and hosts a related blog, Economics of Information. In February 2020, Stanford announced that Brynjolfsson would join its faculty in July.

His research has been recognized with nine "best paper" awards by fellow academics, including the John DC Little Award for the best paper in Marketing Science. Brynjolfsson is the founder of two companies and has been awarded five U.S. patents. Along with Andrew McAfee, he was awarded the top prize in the Digital Thinkers category at the Thinkers 50 Gala on November 9, 2015.

Brynjolfsson is of Icelandic descent.

Work 
Brynjolfsson's is one of the most widely cited scholars studying the economics of information systems. He was among the first researchers to measure productivity contributions of IT and the complementary role of organizational capital and other intangibles. Brynjolfsson has done research on digital commerce, the Long Tail , bundling and pricing models, intangible assets and the effects of IT on business strategy, productivity and performance.

More recently, in his books The Second Machine Age and Race Against the Machine, Brynjolfsson and his co-author Andrew McAfee have argued that technology is racing ahead, and called for greater efforts to update our skills, organizations and institutions more rapidly.

Information technology and productivity 
Brynjolfsson wrote an influential review of the "IT Productivity Paradox"   and in separate research, documented a correlation between IT investment and productivity. His work provides evidence that the use of Information Technology is most likely to increase productivity when it is combined with complementary business processes and human capital.

Measuring the Digital Economy 
Working with Avinash Collis and others, Brynjolfsson developed new methods for measuring the digital economy using "massive online choice experiments".  The insight from this work is that even when goods like Wikipedia or email have zero price, and therefore may have little or no direct contribution to GDP as it is conventionally measured, they may still contribute significantly to well-being and consumer surplus.  Brynjolfsson's method seeks to measure the consumer surplus from these goods and assess how it changes over time.

References

External links 
 Brynjolfsson's Web Site with links to research papers.
 The Stanford Digital Economy Lab.
 Economics of Information Blog
 Profile in Business Week, September 29, 2003. ("If e-business had an oracle, Erik Brynjolfsson would be the anointed.")
 Profile in Optimize, October, 2005. (Brynjolfsson ranked second in research study of "most influential academics of business technology")
 Profile in Supply Chain Management, January, 2006.
 CIO Insight Interview, "Expert Voice: Erik Brynjolfsson on Organizational Capital" October, 2001.
 Profile in  Informationweek, April 17, 2000. ("When it comes to explaining the relationship between IT and worker productivity—bandwagon jumpers like Federal Reserve chairman Alan Greenspan notwithstanding—the generally acknowledged expert in the field is Erik Brynjolfsson ...")
 
 TED Talk on the impact of technical change (TED2013)

1962 births
Living people
Harvard University alumni
MIT Sloan School of Management alumni
MIT Sloan School of Management faculty
American people of Icelandic descent
Harvard University faculty
Stanford University faculty
Information systems researchers